The 1977 Eastern Illinois Panthers football team represented Eastern Illinois University as an independent during the 1977 NCAA Division II football season. The Panthers played their home games at O'Brien Stadium in Charleston, Illinois. Led by third-year head coach John Konstantinos Eastern Illinois compiled a record of 1–10.

Schedule

References

Eastern Illinois
Eastern Illinois Panthers football seasons
Eastern Illinois Panthers football